Akrokomai, Akrokomoi (Ancient Greek, Ακρόκομοι) an epithet given to certain Thracians by Greeks due to their hair arrangement.

References

See also
List of Thracian tribes

Thracians